Belinuridae is an extinct family of arthropods belonging to the order Xiphosura. The family consists of several genera.

References

Xiphosura
Prehistoric arthropod families